The 1976 German motorcycle Grand Prix was the eleventh round of the 1976 Grand Prix motorcycle racing season. It took place on 29 August 1976 at the Nürburgring circuit. The 500cc race was known for being the distinguished Giacomo Agostini's 122nd and final victory in Grand Prix motorcycle competition, a record that still stands today.

500 cc classification

350 cc classification

250 cc classification

125 cc classification

50 cc classification

Sidecar classification

References

German motorcycle Grand Prix
German
German Motorcycle Grand Prix
Sport in Rhineland-Palatinate